Kay McFarland (April 10, 1938 – May 26, 2022) was an American football wide receiver who played in the National Football League (NFL).

Early life and high school
McFarland was born in Quincy, Illinois and grew up in Englewood, Colorado, where he attended Englewood High School. He was named All-State in both basketball and football.

College career
McFarland attended Colorado State University to play basketball and join the track team as a long-jumper. He lettered in each sport three times and was part of the Rams 1961 Skyline Conference championship team in basketball. After being drafted by the San Francisco 49ers, McFarland opted to use his final season of eligibility to join the football team and play while finishing his undergraduate degree. He led the Rams in receiving in 1961 with 18 catches for 196 yards and two touchdowns.

Professional career
McFarland was selected in the 18th round of the 1961 NFL Draft by the San Francisco 49ers despite not having played football yet in college. He signed with the team in 1962 after playing a season of football at Colorado State. McFarland was cut midway through his rookie season but was re-signed by the 49ers on December 11, 1962. McFarland missed the entire 1967 season due to a dislocated elbow. McFarland was used primarily as a blocking end in the NFL. He finished his professional career with 45 receptions for 682 yards and four touchdowns in 63 games played. McFarland retired from football after the 1968 season at the age of 30.

References

External links
Colorado State Hall of Fame bio

1938 births
2022 deaths
American football wide receivers
Colorado State Rams football players
Players of American football from Colorado
San Francisco 49ers players
Colorado State Rams men's basketball players
Colorado State Rams men's track and field athletes
People from Englewood, Colorado